Merritt Mountain Music Festival was an outdoor music festival in Merritt, British Columbia, Canada.  In 2005, the festival hosted a record breaking attendance of approximately 148,000 people throughout the 6 day event.

In 2009, the festival ownership stated that they may not return in 2010 due to disappointing attendance unless a financial partner can be found.  The festival returned in 2011 with lower admission and camping prices in an effort to boost attendance,  but the 2012 festival was cancelled due to low ticket sales.

2009 Main Stage Line-up

Thursday July 9

Paul Brandt

Friday July 10
The Steve Miller Band
Emerson Drive
Jo Dee Messina

Saturday July 11
Kenny Chesney
Johnny Reid

Sunday July 12
 George Canyon
 Pam Tillis

2008 Main Stage Line-up

Jessie Farrell
Pat Green
Aaron Lines
Sugarland
Beverley Mahood
Aaron Pritchett
Dierks Bentley
Hank Williams Jr.
Kelly Brock
Gord Bamford
The Wilkinsons
The Judds
Rick Tippe
George Fox
Jo Hikk
Sara Evans

2007 Main Stage Line-up

Reba McEntire
Tanya Tucker
Carrie Underwood
Gretchen Wilson
Creedence Clearwater Revisited
Emerson Drive
The Road Hammers
Mark Wills
Johnny Reid
Duane Steele
Jimmy Murphy
Minnie Murphy
Kenny Hess
Appaloosa
Sibel Thrasher and the Gospel Infuzion
Country Sisters
The Molnars
The Sapach Family Band
Tracy Chamberlain
Marion Weston
Jessica Griffiths
Headwater

2006 Main Stage Line-up

Martina McBride
Travis Tritt
Big & Rich
Randy Travis
Carolyn Dawn Johnson
The Road Hammers
BlackHawk
Little Texas
Restless Heart
Darryl Worley
Aaron Pritchett
Michelle Wright
Rick Tippe
Elmer Tippe
Dr. Hook
The Higgins

2005 Main Stage Line-up

Tim McGraw
Lonestar
Chely Wright
Lynne Taylor Donovan
Mel Tillis
Paul Brandt
Neal McCoy
Ian Tyson
Nitty Gritty Dirt Band
George Canyon
Sugarland
Brad Johner
Doc Walker
Sean Hogan
Corb Lund Band

2004 Main Stage Line-up

Brooks & Dunn
Dwight Yoakam
Anne Murray
Brad Paisley
Sara Evans
The Mavericks
Gary Allan
The Wilkinsons
Deric Ruttan
Lisa Brokop
Jason McCoy
Adam Gregory
Beverley Mahood
Jamie Warren
Steve Fox
Duane Steele
Kenny Hess
Lonesome Road
Jake Mathews

2003 Main Stage Line-up

LeAnn Rimes
Clint Black
Loretta Lynn
Jo Dee Messina
Marty Stuart
Terri Clark
John Berry
David Lee Murphy
Lee Roy Parnell
Adam Gregory
Dr. Hook
The Good Brothers
Rick Tippe
Patricia Conroy
Brad Johner
Aaron Pritchett
Sean Hogan
Kenny Hess
J. R. Vautour

2002 Main Stage Line-up

Alan Jackson
Martina McBride
Trisha Yearwood
Keith Urban
Carolyn Dawn Johnson
Daryle Singletary
Rhett Akins
Wade Hayes
Lisa Brokop
Julian Austin
Chris Cummings
Steve Fox
Abba Mania
Doc Walker
John Landry
Gil Grand

See also
List of country music festivals
Music in Canada

References

External links
That'sCountry.com

Folk festivals in Canada
Music festivals established in 2002
Country music festivals in Canada
Nicola Country
Music festivals in British Columbia
2002 establishments in British Columbia